Yeaw v. Boy Scouts of America was a high-profile case filed in 1997 before the Supreme Court of California to determine whether the Boy Scouts of America is a business establishment within the meaning of the Unruh Civil Rights Act (Civ. Code, § 51) or has the right to exclude girls from membership.

Background 
Katrina Yeaw attempted to join her twin brother Daniel's Boy Scout Troop No. 349 in the Golden Empire Council in her hometown of Rocklin, California. When she was rejected due to the fact she is female, she filed suit against the Boy Scouts of America, accusing them of discrimination.

Case

In 1995, Katrina Yeaw brought action through James Yeaw, her father and guardian ad litem, against the Boy Scouts of America and the Golden Empire Council. She was represented by activist attorney Gloria Allred.  Yeaw alleged that the BSA is a business establishment within the meaning of California's Civil Code section 51, and that her exclusion was prohibited discrimination by a business establishment.  A pair of similar cases, concerning other exclusion criteria by the Boy Scouts, also came to the California courts as Curran v. Mount Diablo Council of the Boy Scouts of America, 17 Cal. 4th 670, and Randall v. Orange County Council, 17 Cal. 4th 736.

BSA moved to have the case dismissed but Allred sought a preliminary injunction stopping BSA from refusing to admit Katrina to membership in her brother's troop. In 1996, the case went to trial before Sacramento Superior Court Judge John Lewis. After hearing arguments, Judge Lewis denied the preliminary injunction. Judge Lewis noted in his ruling that Katrina was denied admission into a troop and therefore the troop is the appropriate entity upon which to focus in addressing plaintiffs arguments under the act. Relying principally on the California Supreme Court decision in Warfield (Warfield v. Peninsula Golf & Country Club (1995) 10 Cal. 4th 594), Judge Lewis found that a Scout troop is not a business establishment. Judge Lewis maintained that the BSA is a membership organization whose benefits derive primarily from the interpersonal associations among its members.

  Finally, Allred appealed the decision to the California Supreme Court. In a brief order, the California Supreme Court announced that it would consider Katrina's appeal. However, the Court deferred hearing the appeal until a decision was reached in the Curran  pending before the Court at the time.

In March 1998, the California Supreme Court ruled in the Curran and Randall cases that the Boy Scouts of America is not a business establishment, as defined in the Unruh Act, and can therefore set its own membership criteria. Katrina's lawsuit was in effect "finished" by the decision, according to Allred.  A few months later, Katrina withdrew her appeal. However, she vowed to keep fighting, claiming: "I was born a girl, and no matter what else I do with my life, that’s what it all comes down to–being a girl. Being born a boy or a girl is not something you can change, but maybe we can still change the laws that make it legal to discriminate against girls."

See also 

 Scouting in California
 Scouting/USA

References

1998 in United States case law
Boy Scouts of America litigation
Gender inequality in the United States
History of Placer County, California
Supreme Court of California case law
United States gender discrimination case law